The UAAP Season 79 volleyball tournaments started on February 4, 2017 at the Smart Araneta Coliseum in Quezon City, with the opening games of the men and women's senior volleyball tourneys, participated by 8 regular UAAP members. Aside from the Smart Araneta Coliseum, the games will also be held at the Filoil Flying V Centre, San Juan City and the Mall of Asia Arena, Pasay. The tournament host is the University of Santo Tomas, the season's host school.

Rustico "Otie" Camangian will serve as the commissioner of the tournament.

The Ateneo Blue Eagles completed a historic 16-game season sweep earning their 3rd consecutive title against the NU Bulldogs whom they tamed for 12 straight head-to-head matchups since Season 77. The De La Salle University Lady Spikers won their tenth title, defeating the Ateneo Lady Eagles in the finals.

Men's tournament

Season's team line-up

Elimination round

Team standings

Match-up results

Game results

Playoffs

First round 
FEU vs UST One-game playoff.
Elimination round results:
(Mar 04) FEU def. UST3–0 • 25–19, 25–23, 25–22
(Apr 08) FEU def. UST3–0 • 25–23, 25–18, 25–18

Semifinals 
NU vs FEU NU with twice-to-beat advantage.
Elimination round results:
(Feb 25) NU def. FEU3–0 • 25–20, 25–22, 25–23
(Mar 19) NU def. FEU3–0 • 25–21, 25–23, 26–24

Finals 
ADMU vs NU Best-of-three series.
Elimination round results:
(Feb 08) ADMU def. NU 3–1 • 27–25, 25–23, 23–25, 25–16
(Apr 08) ADMU def. NU 3–0 • 25–17, 25–21, 25–16

Awards 

 Most Valuable Player (Season): 
 Most Valuable Player (Finals): 
 Rookie of the Year: 
 Best Scorer: 
 Best Attacker: 
 Best Blocker: 
 Best Setter: 
 Best Server: 
 Best Receiver: 
 Best Digger:

Women's tournament

Line-ups

Elimination round

Team standings

Match-up results

Game results

Playoffs

Semifinals 

Ateneo vs FEU Ateneo with twice-to-beat advantage.
Elimination round results:
(Feb 12) ADMU def. FEU3–2 • 25–19, 24–26, 19–25, 25–16, 15–11
(Mar 18) ADMU def. FEU3–2 • 25–20, 25–22, 17–25, 21–25, 15–8

La Salle vs UST La Salle with twice-to-beat advantage.
Elimination round results:
(Feb 11) DLSU def. UST3–1 • 25–23, 16–25, 25–14, 25–22
(Mar 29) DLSU def. UST3–0 • 25–23, 25–22, 25–21

Finals 
Ateneo vs La Salle Best-of-three series.
This is the sixth straight year that these two teams will face-off in the Finals, with the Lady Spikers winning three of the first five match-ups.

Elimination round results:
(Mar 04) ADMU def. DLSU3–1 • 26–24, 26–24, 21–25, 25–17
(Apr 08) ADMU def. DLSU3–1 • 12–25, 25–20, 25–21, 25–19

Awards 

 Most Valuable Player (Season): 
 Most Valuable Player (Finals): 
 Rookie of the Year: 
 Best Scorer: 
 Best Attacker: 
 Best Blocker: 
 Best Server: 
 Best Digger: 
 Best Setter: 
 Best Receiver:

Broadcast Notes 
All games were aired on S+A Channel 23, and S+A HD Channel 166, Game 2 was also simulcast on ABS-CBN Channel 2 only. No Livestream due to Premier Volleyball League Games Live

Boy's tournament

Elimination round

Team standings

Match-up results

Playoffs

Awards 
 Most Valuable Player (Season): 
 Most Valuable Player (Finals): 
 Rookie of the Year: 
 First Best Outside Spiker: 
 Second Best Outside Spiker: 
 First Best Middle Blocker: 
 Second Best Middle Blocker: 
 Best Opposite Spiker: 
 Best Setter: 
 Best Libero: 
 Best Server:

Girls' tournament

Elimination round

Team standings

Match-up results

Bracket

Awards 
 Most Valuable Player (Season): 
 Most Valuable Player (Finals): 
 Rookie of the Year: 
 First Best Outside Spiker: 
 Second Best Outside Spiker: 
 First Best Middle Blocker: 
 Second Best Middle Blocker: 
 Best Opposite Spiker: 
 Best Setter: 
 Best Libero: 
 Best Server:

Overall championship points

Seniors' division

Juniors' division 

In case of a tie, the team with the higher position in any tournament is ranked higher. If both are still tied, they are listed by alphabetical order.

How rankings are determined:
 Ranks 5th to 8th determined by elimination round standings.
 Loser of the #1 vs #4 semifinal match-up is ranked 4th
 Loser of the #2 vs #3 semifinal match-up is ranked 3rd
 Loser of the finals is ranked 2nd
 Champion is ranked 1st

2017 in Philippine sport
UAAP Season 79
2017 in men's volleyball
2017 in women's volleyball
UAAP volleyball tournaments